Itaporanga is a municipality in the state of Paraíba in the Northeast Region of Brazil. The population is 24,828 (2020 est.) in an area of 468.06 km².

See also
List of municipalities in Paraíba

References

Municipalities in Paraíba